Eamonn Fingleton (born 19 August 1948) is an Irish financial journalist and author who for 27 years covered global finance and economics from a base in Tokyo. His books, written for a general audience, deal with global economics and globalism.  A former editor for the Financial Times and Forbes, he has been published in The Atlantic Magazine, The New York Times, The Guardian, The Washington Post, The Harvard Business Review, The American Prospect, and Prospect.  He has published five books which have been translated into several languages. Three of them – all on global economic themes – were commissioned by US publishers and first published in the United States. Arguing that US observers systematically underestimate the East Asian economic model, he has long claimed that America is in decline. A central theme of his work is that because Japan has continued to invest in ever more advanced manufacturing, the Japanese economy has performed far better in recent decades than is generally understood in the United States. He holds that Japanese leaders have deliberately exaggerated their nation's problems in an attempt to assuage American angst about Japan's trade barriers.

Biography
Born in Ireland in 1948, Fingleton graduated from Trinity College, Dublin, in 1970, earning a degree in economics, mathematics, and English. He worked in Dublin, London, New York City, and Tokyo as a financial journalist before becoming a full-time author in 1991. His first wife, the British journalist and cookery writer Mary McCutchan, and their twin babies Tara and Andrew, died in a car accident in London in 1974. In 1988 he married Japanese businesswoman Yasuko Amako, whose Tokyo-based mail order distribution company specialises in importing European and American luxury goods. He is a brother of artist Sean Fingleton.

Career
Fingleton is best known for his analyses since the mid-1980s of the Japanese business, financial, and manufacturing system, and he has applied lessons from Japan's experience to US, European, and other policy questions. As deputy editor of the international banking magazine Euromoney in the late 1980s, he questioned the sustainability of Japan's super-high land and stock values. He was one of the earliest critics of financialisation, arguing that there is no substitute for advanced manufacturing industries (highly capital-intensive, know-how-intensive industries typically making capital equipment, new materials, and leading edge components) as the main pillar of an advanced economy.

Fingleton suggests that the United States made a catastrophic mistake in the 1990s in allowing leadership in such industries to pass to Japan. This was a major theme of his 1995 book Blindside: Why Japan Is Still on Track to Overtake the US by the Year 2000. It was named one of the Ten Best Business Books of 1995 by BusinessWeek. In 2012, he wrote an article for The New York Times Sunday Review called "The Myth of Japan's Failure" which updated his view that Japan has continued to best the United States all through the "lost decade". The article drew wide commentary. 

His second US-published book, In Praise of Hard Industries: Why Manufacturing, Not the Information Economy, Is the Key to Future Prosperity, published in 1999, took a contrarian stance on the New Economy. His most recent book, In the Jaws of the Dragon, argues that China is not converging to Western values but rather is following the Confucian econo-political model pioneered by Japan and characterised by aggressive mercantilism as well as a state-directed economy.
 Two days before the United States and Britain went to war in Iraq in 2003, he published an op-ed article arguing that the peaceful course of the American occupation of Japan in the late 1940s would not be replicated in post-war Iraq. As a member of a US financial delegation led by New York Stock Exchange chairman John J. Phelan, he met Deng Xiaoping at the Great Hall of the People in Beijing in 1986.
He has repeatedly challenged intellectual opponents to a public debate on the Japanese economy. In the case of two of his most prominent opponents, he offered to make a  $10,000 donation to a good cause of their choice if either was prepared to join him for a public discussion. The offer was not taken up.

Ideas
Fingleton's analysis of East Asian economics is founded on a counterintuitive concept called suppressed consumption. He holds that by suppressing consumption, a government can powerfully boost a nation's savings rate.

In an address to the Ukrainian Academy of Sciences in 2008, he stated: "The resulting huge flows of capital are....  channeled via state controlled banks towards those corporations deemed most likely to make effective use of the money in boosting productivity." 
"How is consumption suppressed? The most obvious method is via tight controls on consumer credit. Less obviously the economy is regulated to make it physically difficult for consumers to consume (for instance, by severely limiting access to imported luxuries and by tightly restricting the supply of housing space). Sometimes the resulting savings arise in the hands of consumers. In many cases, however, they accrue to corporations in the form of super-high retained profits. Such profits are then used to build national muscle in targeted industries. A typical arrangement is that cartels keep consumer prices high, thereby allowing member firms to earn the necessary high returns to keep investing at a fast pace in the export side of their business. Cartels are generally given free rein provided only that they serve the national goal of boosting productivity."

Fingleton emphasises the degree to which Japan and other advanced manufacturing nations such as Germany have established global monopolies – in his terms "chokepoints" – in supplying little-noticed but vital materials, components, and production machinery without which less advanced manufacturing nations such as China could not manufacture consumer goods. Writing in the New Republic in 2011, he commented: "[A]s world manufacturing has become more technologically advanced, it is more likely that a single supplier, or even a single factory, can be critical to a whole industry. And we know that, in this vein, Japanese corporations enjoy monopolies or oligopolies in a host of crucial niches in supplying advanced materials, components and production machinery for industries like electronics, cars, and aerospace. In two books in the 1990s, I made a sustained effort to track Japan's more important manufacturing 'chokepoints,' as they are known to customers. I succeeded in identifying close to 100. Some are well known, such as the YKK Company's global lock on zip fasteners and Shimano's dominance in bicycle gears. Many have hitherto gone largely unnoticed, but are actually much more important to the smooth functioning of the world economy. A good example is semiconductor-grade silicon—a highly purified not-an-atom-out-of-place material that only a couple of companies worldwide can make. The leading suppliers, Shin-Etsu and Sumco, are both Japanese and, as far as I can tell, there are no significant suppliers left in either Europe or America."

Fingleton writes that a crucial part of Japan's strategy is to keep its most advanced production technologies at home, thereby maximising the productivity advantage of its home workforce. In testimony to the US-China Economic and Security Review Commission in 2005, he stated: "It is taken for granted in Japan that production technologies are as much the nation's property as they are the property of the corporations that developed them…. It is assumed by all concerned that the latest technologies will be applied in the first instance in factories at home, thereby giving Japanese workers a vital edge in global competition. Any decision to move the technologies abroad will be the result of a government-guided industry consensus. Thus although corporate Japan has transferred significant production technologies to China in recent years, it has never given away the crown jewels."

As for Japan's "lost decades," Fingleton holds that slower growth in recent years is largely explained by a demographic switchback. In sharp contrast with earlier years when Japan experienced fast population growth, in recent years there has been a consistent reduction of about 1 percent a year in the working-age population. While this has applied a steady brake to growth in headline GDP, growth in per-worker output has continued at satisfactory levels.   The demographic trend moreover is largely explained by a policy of population reduction, similar to, if less draconian than, China's one-child policy. Japan's policy, which has been aimed at improving the nation's food security, began with the Eugenic Protection Act of 1948, which introduced various measures to reduce the birthrate, most notably easy abortion.

Books
In the Jaws of the Dragon: America's Fate in the Coming Era of Chinese Hegemony (2008). St. Martin's Press/Thomas Dunne Books. 
In Praise of Hard Industries: Why Manufacturing, Not the Information Economy, Is the Key to Future Prosperity (1999). Houghton Mifflin. 
Blindside: Why Japan Is Still on Track to Overtake the US By the Year 2000 (1995). Houghton Mifflin.

External links
Official website and blog
Unsustainable.org: A Website on the U.S. Trade Policy Disaster, website 2001–2010

References

1948 births
Living people
Alumni of Trinity College Dublin
Irish journalists
Irish writers
The Atlantic (magazine) people
Place of birth missing (living people)